This is a list of destinations of Pan American World Airways before closure, or at closure (1991), served by mainline operations.

Refer to Pan Am Express for a full list of regional destinations served between 1981 and 1991.

Africa

Central Africa 
 Cameroon
 Douala – Douala International Airport
 Gabon
 Libreville – Léon-Mba International Airport
 Zaire
 Kinshasa – N'djili Airport

Eastern Africa 
 Kenya
 Nairobi – Jomo Kenyatta International Airport
 Tanzania
 Dar es Salaam – Dar es Salaam International Airport
 Uganda
 Kampala – Entebbe International Airport

Northern Africa 
 Egypt
 Cairo – Cairo International Airport
 Morocco
 Casablanca – Mohammed V International Airport
 Rabat – Rabat–Salé Airport
 Tunisia
 Tunis – Tunis–Carthage International Airport

Southern Africa 
 South Africa
 Johannesburg – Jan Smuts International Airport

Western Africa 
 Benin
 Cotonou – Cadjehoun Airport
 Ivory Coast
 Abidjan – Félix-Houphouët-Boigny International Airport
 Ghana
 Accra – Kotoka International Airport
 Guinea
 Conakry – Conakry International Airport
 Liberia
 Monrovia – Roberts International Airport
 Nigeria
 Lagos – Murtala Muhammed International Airport
 Senegal
 Dakar – Léopold Sédar Senghor International Airport

Americas

Caribbean 
 Antigua and Barbuda
 Antigua – V.C. Bird International Airport
 Bahamas
 Nassau – Lynden Pindling International Airport
 Rock Sound – Rock Sound International Airport
 Barbados
 Bridgetown – Seawell Airport
 Cayman Islands
 Grand Cayman – Owen Roberts International Airport
 Curaçao
 Willemstad – Hato International Airport
 Dominican Republic
 Puerto Plata – Gregorio Luperón International Airport
 San Pedro de Macorís – Cueva Las Maravillas Airport
 Santo Domingo – Las Américas International Airport
 Guadeloupe
 Pointe-a-Pitre – Pointe-à-Pitre International Airport
 Haiti
 Port-au-Prince – Toussaint Louverture International Airport
 Jamaica
 Kingston – Norman Manley International Airport
 Montego Bay – Sangster International Airport
 Martinique
 Fort de France – Martinique Aimé Césaire International Airport
 Puerto Rico
 San Juan – Luis Muñoz Marín International Airport
 Sint Maarten
 Philipsburg – Princess Juliana International Airport
 Saint Kitts and Nevis
 St. Kitts – Robert L. Bradshaw International Airport
 Saint Lucia
 Castries – Hewanorra International Airport
 Trinidad and Tobago
 Port of Spain, Trinidad – Piarco International Airport
 Turks and Caicos Islands
 Grand Turk – JAGS McCartney International Airport
 Providenciales – Providenciales International Airport
 United States Virgin Islands
 Saint Croix - Henry E. Rohlsen International Airport
 Frederiksted – Alexander Hamilton International Airport
 St. Thomas – Cyril E. King Airport

Central America 
 Costa Rica
 San José –Juan Santamaría International Airport
 El Salvador
 San Salvador – Cuscatlan International Airport
 Guatemala
 Guatemala City – La Aurora International Airport
 Honduras
 San Pedro Sula – Ramón Villeda Morales International Airport
 Tegucigalpa – Toncontín International Airport
 Nicaragua
 Managua – Las Mercedes International Airport
 Panama
 Panama City – Tocumen International Airport

North America 
 Bermuda
 Saint David - L.F. Wade International Airport
 Canada
 Gander – Gander International Airport
 Toronto – Toronto Pearson International Airport
 Whitehorse – Erik Nielsen Whitehorse International Airport
 Vancouver – Vancouver International Airport
 Mexico
 Cancún – Cancún International Airport
 Mérida – Mérida International Airport
 Mexico City – Mexico City International Airport
 Monterrey – Monterrey International Airport
 Tampico – Tampico International Airport
 Tapachula – Tapachula International Airport
 United States
 Alaska
 Fairbanks – Fairbanks International Airport
 Juneau – Juneau International Airport
 Ketchikan – Ketchikan International Airport
 Nome – Nome Airport
 Tanacross – Tanacross Airport
 California
 Los Angeles – Los Angeles International Airport
 San Diego – San Diego International Airport
 San Francisco – San Francisco International Airport
 Colorado
 Denver – Stapleton International Airport
 Connecticut
 Hartford – Bradley International Airport
 Florida
 Fort Lauderdale – Fort Lauderdale–Hollywood International Airport
 Fort Myers – Southwest Florida International Airport
 Jacksonville – Jacksonville International Airport
 Melbourne – Melbourne Orlando International Airport
 Miami – Miami International Airport Hub
 Orlando – Orlando International Airport
 Pensacola – Pensacola International Airport
 St. Petersburg – St. Pete–Clearwater International Airport
 Sarasota/Bradenton – Sarasota–Bradenton International Airport
 Tampa – Tampa International Airport
 West Palm Beach – Palm Beach International Airport
 Georgia
 Atlanta – Hartsfield–Jackson Atlanta International Airport
 Savannah – Savannah/Hilton Head International Airport
 Hawaii
 Hilo – Hilo International Airport
 Honolulu – Daniel K. Inouye International Airport
 Illinois
 Chicago – O'Hare International Airport
 Indiana
 Indianapolis – Indianapolis International Airport
 Louisiana
 New Orleans – Louis Armstrong New Orleans International Airport
 Maryland
 Baltimore – Baltimore Washington International Airport
 Massachusetts
 Boston – Logan International Airport
 Michigan
 Detroit – Detroit Metropolitan Wayne County Airport
 Minnesota
 Minneapolis/Saint Paul – Minneapolis–Saint Paul International Airport
 Missouri
 Kansas City – Kansas City International Airport
 St. Louis – St. Louis Lambert International Airport
 New Hampshire
 Portsmouth – Portsmouth International Airport at Pease
 New Jersey
 Newark – Newark Liberty International Airport
 New York
 New York City
 John F. Kennedy International Airport - (Worldport)
 LaGuardia Airport - (Marine Air Terminal)
 Port Washington – Sands Point Seaplane Base
 North Carolina
 Charlotte – Charlotte Douglas International Airport
 Raleigh/Durham – Raleigh–Durham International Airport
 Ohio
 Cleveland – Cleveland Hopkins International Airport
 Oregon
 Portland – Portland International Airport
 Pennsylvania
 Philadelphia – Philadelphia International Airport
 Pittsburgh – Pittsburgh International Airport
 Rhode Island
 Providence – T.F. Green Airport
 Tennessee
 Nashville – Nashville International Airport
 Texas
 Austin – Robert Mueller Municipal Airport
 Corpus Christi – Corpus Christi International Airport
 Dallas/Fort Worth – Dallas/Fort Worth International Airport
 Houston – George Bush Intercontinental Airport Focus City
 San Antonio – San Antonio International Airport
 Utah
 Salt Lake City – Salt Lake City International Airport
 Virginia
 Norfolk – Norfolk International Airport
 Washington, D.C.
 Washington Dulles International Airport Focus City
 Ronald Reagan Washington National Airport
 Washington
 Seattle/Tacoma – Seattle–Tacoma International Airport

South America 
 Argentina
 Buenos Aires – Ministro Pistarini International Airport
 Bolivia
 La Paz – El Alto International Airport
 Brazil
 Recife – Recife/Guararapes-Gilberto Freyre International Airport
 Rio de Janeiro – Rio de Janeiro/Galeão International Airport
 São Paulo – São Paulo/Guarulhos International Airport
 Chile
 Santiago – Arturo Merino Benítez International Airport
 Colombia
 Barranquilla – Ernesto Cortissoz International Airport
 Bogotá – El Dorado International Airport
 Cali – Alfonso Bonilla Aragón International Airport
 Medellín
 José María Córdova International Airport
 Olaya Herrera Airport
 Ecuador
 Guayaquil – José Joaquín de Olmedo International Airport
 Quito – Old Mariscal Sucre International Airport
 French Guiana
 Cayenne – Cayenne – Félix Eboué Airport
 Guyana
 Georgetown – Timehri International Airport
 Paraguay
 Asunción – Silvio Petirrosi International Airport
 Peru
 Lima – Jorge Chavez International Airport
 Suriname
 Paramaribo – Paramaribo-Zanderij International Airport
 Uruguay
 Montevideo – Carrasco International Airport
 Venezuela
 Caracas – Simón Bolívar International Airport
 Coro - José Leonardo Chirino Airport
 Maracaibo – La Chinita International Airport
 Maturin - José Tadeo Monagas International Airport

Asia

East Asia 
 China
 Beijing – Beijing Capital International Airport
 Shanghai – Shanghai Hongqiao International Airport
 Hong Kong
 Kai Tak Airport
 Japan
 Osaka - Itami Airport
 Tokyo
 Haneda Airport
 Narita International Airport
 South Korea
 Seoul – Gimpo International Airport
 Taiwan
 Taipei
 Songshan Airport
 Chiang Kai-shek International Airport

South Asia 
 Afghanistan
 Kabul – Kabul International Airport
 Bangladesh
 Dhaka – Shahjalal International Airport
 India
 Bombay – Sahar International Airport
 Calcutta – Dum Dum Airport
 Delhi – Palam International Airport
 Maldives
 Malé – Velana International Airport
 Nepal
 Kathmandu – Tribhuvan International Airport
 Pakistan
 Karachi – Jinnah International Airport
 Sri Lanka
 Colombo
 Ratmalana Airport
 Bandaranaike International Airport

Southeast Asia 
 Burma
 Rangoon – Mingaladon Airport
 Indonesia
 Denpasar – Ngurah Rai International Airport
 Jakarta – Kemayoran Airport
 Malaysia
 Kuala Lumpur
 Simpang International Airport
 Subang International Airport
 Philippines
 Manila – Ninoy Aquino International Airport
 Singapore
 Kallang International Airport
 Paya Lebar International Airport
 Singapore Changi Airport
 South Vietnam
 Cam Ranh – Cam Ranh International Airport
 Da Nang – Da Nang International Airport
 Saigon – Tan Son Nhat International Airport
 Thailand
 Bangkok – Don Mueang International Airport

Middle East 
 Bahrain
 Manama – Bahrain International Airport
 Iran
 Tehran – Mehrabad International Airport
 Iraq
 Baghdad – Baghdad International Airport
 Israel
 Tel Aviv – Ben Gurion Airport
 Jordan
 Amman – Queen Alia International Airport
 Kuwait
 Kuwait City – Kuwait International Airport
 Lebanon
 Beirut – Beirut–Rafic Hariri International Airport
 Syria
 Damascus – Damascus International Airport
 United Arab Emirates
 Dubai – Dubai International Airport

Europe

Central Europe 
 Austria
 Vienna – Vienna International Airport
 Switzerland
 Geneva – Geneva Airport
 Zürich – Zurich Airport

Western Europe 
 Belgium
 Brussels – Brussels Airport
 France
 Nice – Nice Côte d'Azur Airport
 Paris
 Charles de Gaulle Airport
 Orly Airport
 Paris–Le Bourget Airport
 West Germany
 Berlin
 Berlin Tegel Airport
 Berlin Tempelhof Airport
 Bremen – Bremen Airport
 Cologne/Bonn – Cologne Bonn Airport
 Düsseldorf – Düsseldorf Airport
 Hamburg – Hamburg Airport
 Hanover – Hannover Airport
 Frankfurt – Frankfurt Airport
 Munich – Munich-Riem Airport
 Nuremberg – Nuremberg Airport
 Saarbrücken – Saarbrücken Airport
 Stuttgart – Stuttgart Airport
 Sylt – Sylt Airport
 Ireland
 Shannon – Shannon Airport
 Netherlands
 Amsterdam – Amsterdam Airport Schiphol
 United Kingdom
 London
 Croydon Airport
 Gatwick Airport
 Heathrow Airport
 Glasgow – Glasgow Prestwick Airport

Eastern Europe 
 Bulgaria
 Sofia – Sofia Airport
 Czechoslovakia
 Prague – Prague Ruzyně International Airport
 Hungary
 Budapest – Budapest Ferihegy International Airport
 Poland
 Kraków – Kraków John Paul II International Airport
 Warsaw – Okęcie Airport
 Romania
 Bucharest – Henri Coandă International Airport
 Soviet Union
 Leningrad – Pulkovo Airport
 Moscow – Sheremetyevo International Airport

Northern Europe 
 Denmark
 Copenhagen – Copenhagen Airport
 Finland
 Helsinki – Helsinki Airport
 Iceland
 Reykjavík – Keflavík International Airport
 Norway
 Bergen – Flesland Airport
 Oslo – Fornebu Airport
 Sweden
 Stockholm – Stockholm Arlanda Airport

Southern Europe 
 Greece
 Athens – Ellinikon International Airport
 Italy
 Milan – Milan Malpensa Airport
 Rome – Leonardo da Vinci–Fiumicino Airport
 Portugal
 Lisbon – Lisbon Airport
 Santa Maria Island – Santa Maria Airport (Azores)
 Terceira Island – Lajes Airport
 Spain
 Barcelona – Josep Tarradellas Barcelona–El Prat Airport
 Madrid – Adolfo Suárez Madrid–Barajas Airport
 Turkey
 Ankara – Ankara Esenboğa Airport
 Istanbul – Istanbul Atatürk Airport
 Yugoslavia
 Belgrade – Belgrade Nikola Tesla Airport
 Dubrovnik – Dubrovnik Airport
 Sarajevo – Sarajevo International Airport
 Zagreb – Zagreb Airport

Oceania

Australasia 
 Australia
 Melbourne – Melbourne Airport
 Sydney – Sydney Airport
 New Zealand
 Auckland – Auckland Airport

Melanesia 
 Fiji
 Nadi – Nadi International Airport
 New Caledonia
 Nouméa – La Tontouta International Airport

Micronesia 
 Guam
 Antonio B. Won Pat International Airport
 Kiribati
 Kanton Island – Canton Island Airport – (Trans-Pacific Stopover)
 Wake Island
 Wake Island Airfield

Polynesia 
 American Samoa
 Pago Pago – Pago Pago International Airport
 French Polynesia
 Papeete – Faa'a International Airport

References

External links 

 "Pan Am Stretches" TIME

Lists of airline destinations
Pan Am